Seaforth are the musical duo of Tom Jordan and Mitch Thompson. They are signed to Sony Nashville and released their debut EP in April 2019.

Career

2017-2021: Career Beginnings
Tom Jordan and Mitch Thompson grew up together in the Sydney, Australia suburb of Seaforth. After forming the band and considering multiple monikers, the duo decided to name themselves after their hometown.

Jordan and Thompson travelled back and forth between the USA and Australia for six years, developing their songwriting and in 2017, they moved to USA full-time. 

In November 2018, they signed with RCA/Sony Nashville. and on 16 November 2018, released their debut singles "Love That" and "Talk to Me".

In April 2019, Seaforth released their debut EP Love That. In May 2019, Taste of Country named the duo one of '5 Artists to Watch'.

In July, Seaforth collaborated with fellow country artist Mitchell Tenpenny on a single called "Anything She Says". At the global APRA Awards in March 2020, Seaforth won Breakthrough Songwriter of the Year award.

On 29 May 2020, Seaforth released "Everything Falls for You". Upon release the duo said "Our buddy Derrick Southerland brought in the title 'Everything Falls for You' and we instantly knew it was special. Through specific imagery – whether it be the rose petals, rain, stars – we wanted to paint the picture of falling in love with someone incredible, and how it can feel like the whole world is falling for them with you."

On 2 April 2021, it was reported that Seaforth moved to Arista Nashville from RCA Nashville.

2022: What I Get for Loving You
In August 2022, Seaforth announced the forthcoming release of EP What I Get for Loving You. The EP features previously released singles, "Breakups", "Good Beer", "Queen of Daytona Beach" and the title track. The duo co-wrote Canadian country artists Dallas Smith and MacKenzie Porter's 2022 duet single "One Too" with Rocky Block and Alyssa Vanderhym.

Tours
Seaforth have toured with recording artist Mitchell Tenpenny and have also opened for Kane Brown.

Discography

EPs

Singles as lead artist

Singles as featured artist

Awards and nominations

APRA Awards (Australia)
The APRA Awards are held in Australia and New Zealand by the Australasian Performing Right Association to recognise songwriting skills, sales and airplay performance by its members annually. Seaforth have been nominated for two awards.

! 
|-
| 2020
| "Love That"
| Most Performed Country Work of the Year
| 
| 
|-
| 2022
| "Breakups"
| Most Performed Country Work of the Year
| 
| 
|-

APRA Awards (Global)

|-
| 2020
| Themselves
| Breakthrough Songwriter of the Year (Nashville)
|

Country Music Awards of Australia
The Country Music Awards of Australia is an annual awards night held in January during the Tamworth Country Music Festival. Celebrating recording excellence in the Australian country music industry. They commenced in 1973.

! 
|-
| 2020 ||Seaforth ("Love That") || New Talent of the Year ||  ||

References

External links
  /WeAreSeaforth.com

Australian country music groups
Musical groups established in 2017
2017 establishments in Australia